Britain's Finest is a TV documentary series made by independent production company Lion Television, now part of All3Media for Channel 5 in the UK. The executive producer across the series was Bill Locke.

The eight 90-minute series, split into two separate series of four episodes, the first in 2003 and the second in 2005, focuses on a wide range of Britain's finest things, from buildings to gardens, actors to natural wonders, as voted for by Channel 5 viewers and Radio Times readers. Each episode has a lead presenter and includes a variety of additional specialists.

The publicity generated for some of the visitor attractions featured, such as stately homes, led to an increase in visitor numbers.

Episodes

Series 1
"Stately Homes". Presenter Hugh Scully, Producer and Director Stuart Elliott
"Gardens". Presenter Jenny Agutter, Director and Producer Jane Cameron
"Ancient Monuments". Presenter Tim Marlow, Producer Peter Sommer, Director Sabine Pusch
"Castles". Presenter Richard Holmes, Producer Sabine Pusch, Director Peter Sommer

Series 2
"Actors". Presenter Fay Ripley, Director Jim Funnel, Producer Jim Funnel
"Actresses". Presenter Simon Callow, Director Kenny Scott, Producer Kenny Scott
"Treasures". Presenter Tim Marlow, Director Sabine Pusch, Producer: Sabine Pusch
"Natural Wonders". Presenter Nigel Marven, Director Stuart Elliott, Producer Stuart Elliott

References

External links
 

2000s British documentary television series
British television documentaries
2003 British television series debuts
2005 British television series debuts
2003 British television series endings
2005 British television series endings
Television series by All3Media
English-language television shows